"Open All Night" is a song written and recorded by rock musician Bruce Springsteen, which first appeared on Springsteen's 1982 solo album Nebraska.

History
Of the 10 songs on Nebraska, "Open All Night" is the only one to feature an electric guitar. With a Chuck Berry-style guitar riff, the song tells the story of an unnamed narrator's all-night drive across industrial New Jersey to reach his girl, Wanda, whom he met when she was a waitress at the Route 60 Bob's Big Boy.

"Open All Night" was released as a single in the UK, backed by "The Big Payback", but did not chart. It was also released as a single in The Netherlands and Spain.  Though never released as a single in the United States, it garnered enough album oriented rock airplay to reach #22 on the U.S. Billboard Mainstream Rock Tracks chart.

The song shares a common lyrical structure and themes with two other Springsteen songs. The first is "State Trooper," also found on the Nebraska album. The other was "Living on the Edge of the World", recorded in 1979 but released as part of the four-disk box set Tracks in 1998.

Springsteen performed this song infrequently until the Sessions Band Tour of 2006, when it was transformed into an eight-minute "show-stopping rave-up" whose already surreal lyrics were made more strange by being rapped against a big band swing arrangement and a pseudo-Andrews Sisters female backing vocal trio. This is the version that appears on the Live in Dublin CD and DVD.

During a show on September 14, 1984 in Philadelphia, Springsteen introduced the song as being "about the Golden Roadway of the East... the New Jersey Turnpike!" Before performing the song he tells the story of him being pulled over by a policeman right after getting off at Exit 8 in Hightstown while driving back home from New York City. During the stop Springsteen did not have his license and car registration on him and although he was recognized by the officer as being that "rock and roll singer" who "wrote that Born to Run song", he was told he was "in a lot of trouble". The police officer issued him a ticket and Springsteen had to appear in traffic court. When he later appeared in traffic court Springsteen tried to talk his way out of the ticket by pleading "guilty with an explanation" but the judge ruled that he had to pay the fine. While walking out of traffic court Springsteen walked past the Hightstown officer who said to him, "Son, stop by anytime, because out on highway we're open all night". This performance is documented on the bootleg recording Nebraska Live released by E.ST. Records (Recording #: ES-22). This is apparently one of two versions of a bootleg recording called Nebraska Live.

Jay Farrar of Son Volt recorded a version which was released in 2005 on A Retrospective: 1995–2000.

In November 2014 Pearl Jam covered the song in Lincoln, Nebraska.

Personnel
According to authors Philippe Margotin and Jean-Michel Guesdon:

Bruce Springsteen – vocals, guitar

References

1982 singles
Bruce Springsteen songs
Songs written by Bruce Springsteen
Columbia Records singles
1982 songs
Song recordings produced by Bruce Springsteen